MV or HSC Maria Dolores is a high-speed catamaran ferry owned by Virtu Ferries. It was built by Austal in 2005–06, entering service as a ferry between Malta and Sicily in March 2006. The vessel soon became too small to allow for the increasing passenger and cargo traffic on this route, and in October 2010 it was replaced by the larger catamaran .

In 2011, the vessel took part in evacuating people from Tripoli during the Libyan Civil War. Between 2012 and 2020, it was leased to Inter Shipping SRA as a ferry between Tarifa and Tangier.

Description

The vessel has six MTU 16V 4000 M73L diesel engines, which drive six Rolls-Royce Kamewa waterjets (four 80 SII and two 80 BII) through six ZF gearboxes, providing propulsion for the vessel. It is the first ever fast ferry installed with sextuple waterjets.

The vessel could accommodate 16 crew members and 600 passengers. It has three lounges: one for club class and two for tourists. The vessel has a capacity of 65 cars, or 95 truck lane metres and 35 cars. An aft ramp and a side ramp allow vehicles to be loaded and unloaded.

Construction
Maria Dolores was built by Austal in Western Australia. It was built in accordance to IMO codes, Malta Flag statutory requirements and Italian Port State requirements. A labour shortage led to construction taking longer than expected, delaying the planned delivery date of mid-2005. The vessel was mostly complete by September 2005, with sea trials beginning in November.

The vessel was handed over to Virtu Ferries on 3 February 2006, and it departed Fremantle on the journey to Malta on 7 February. On the delivery voyage, the vessel called at the Cocos (Keeling) Islands, the Maldives, Aden and Suez, then passed through the Suez Canal with further stops at Port Said, Pozzallo and finally Malta.

Career

Malta–Sicily ferry

The vessel was inaugurated by Prime Minister Lawrence Gonzi on 28 March 2006. Before it entered service, an open day was held and the public were invited to visit the vessel. The vessel operated year-round scheduled routes between Malta, Pozzallo and Catania in Sicily, and Reggio Calabria on mainland Italy. Routes from Malta took 90 minutes to Pozzallo, 3 hours to Catania and 4.5 hours to Reggio Calabria.

On 21 December 2007, Maria Dolores carried the first Maltese passengers able to travel without passports to Pozzallo, on the same day that Malta joined the Schengen Area.

Maria Dolores was meant to reduce delivery time of goods traveling between Malta and Sicily, reducing importation and exportation costs for Maltese companies. The cargo volume carried on the vessel was actually much greater than expected, and predicted cargo figures for 2015 were reached by 2009. The Jean de La Valette, also built by Austal, replaced Maria Dolores on the Malta-Sicily route in October 2010.

Later career

After the vessel was out of service, plans were made for it to operate on a different undisclosed route in the Mediterranean Sea.

During the Libyan Civil War, the vessel was chartered by the US Embassy in Malta to evacuate some 500 to 550 people from Libya. Maria Dolores left Malta on 22 February 2011 and arrived in Tripoli on the following day. Embarkation of the passengers took longer than expected, and the vessel left Libya on 25 February, arriving in Malta on the same day. Two other Virtu Ferries catamarans, San Gwann and San Pawl, also took part in the evacuations.

In 2012, Maria Dolores was chartered to Inter Shipping SRA for a period of five years. The time charter agreement was renewed in 2017 with a three-year lease which expired on 31 May 2020. The vessel was operated by Inter Shipping SRA on a time charter basis on routes between Tarifa in Spain and Tangier in Morocco until this service was suspended due to the COVID-19 pandemic.

On 2 April 2022, during Pope Francis' visit to Malta, he traveled on board the Maria Dolores in an hour-long journey from the Grand Harbour to Mġarr, Gozo.

Notes

References

External links
 

2005 ships
Ships built by Austal
High-speed craft
Individual catamarans
Ferries of Malta
Ferries of Italy
Ferries of Spain
Ferries of Morocco
Virtu Ferries